Paolo Belli (born 21 March 1962, in Formigine) is an Italian singer and television presenter.

Biography
Singer since 1984, first with Ladri di Biciclette and then as a solo artist, Paolo Belli is best known for his co-host, with his Big Band, of the Italian version of the international reality show Strictly Come Dancing, hosted by Milly Carlucci and aired on Rai 1 with the name of Ballando con le Stelle from September 2005. In 2012, Belli hosted from 24 March to 7 April, with Ria Antoniou and Milly Carlucci, the race of champions named Ballando con te with past champions of the past editions of Ballando con le Stelle. In 2013, Paolo Belli along with Arianna Ciampoli and Fabrizio Frizzi, hosted the Italian version of Telethon aired on Rai 1. In 2014 Paolo Belli hosted the new edition, aired on Rai 2, of Telethon with Amadeus, Arianna Ciampoli, Fabrizio Frizzi, Caterina Balivo and Camila Raznovich. The professional couple Carlucci-Belli hosted many street events of Ballando and two editions of Telethon (in 2002 with Walter Santillo and Antonio Lubrano as co-host, in 2007 with Alessia Mancini as co-host) aired by Rai 1.

In 2016 he was part of the Italian jury at the Eurovision Song Contest.

In 2020 he sings Come gira il mondo in duet with its author Franco Simone.

Discography

Con i Ladri di Biciclette
1989 – Ladri di Biciclette
1991 – Figli di un DO minore

Da solista
1993 – Paolo Belli & Rhythm Machine
1994 – Solo
1997 – Negro
1999 – A me mi piace... lo swing – live
2000 – Belli dentro
2001 – Belli... e pupe
2003 – I+Belli di... Paolo
2003 – Sorridi... e va avanti
2005 – Belli... in smoking
2006 – Più Belli di così
2009 – 20 anni
2011 – Giovani e Belli
2013 – Sangue Blues

Singles
1989 – Ladri di Biciclette
1989 – Dr Jazz e Mr.Funk
1990 – Sotto questo sole con Francesco Baccini
2007 – Juve (storia di un grande amore)
2008 – Io sono un gigolò
2009 – L'opportunità con Pupo ed Youssou N'Dour
2009 – Una piccola bestia di razza di cane
2011 – Storie con il Trio Medusa
2011 – Faccio festa – Official theme song of the program of 2011 Giro d'Italia
2020 - Come gira il mondo in duet with its author Franco Simone.

References

External links

1962 births
Living people
Italian television personalities
Italian male singers